Daniel Avery is an English electronic music producer and DJ from Bournemouth.

Career

Early life and musical beginnings
Avery was primarily a fan of guitar music in his youth, performing in local bands inspired by Kyuss and My Bloody Valentine. He became a regular attendee at dance music club night Project Mayhem, before eventually being invited to DJ by the night's promoter. He moved to London in 2007, and first began producing and DJing in 2009 under the name Stopmakingme, collaborating with Little Boots, Hercules and Love Affair, and Metronomy, and regularly performing at Fabric. During this period, Avery worked at the now-defunct Pure Groove record shop in Smithfield Market, London. There he met future collaborators Kelly Lee Owens and James Greenwood. Owens contributed to Avery's debut album,  Drone Logic, and Avery produced her first EP, Oleic. In 2011, the shop closed, and he reverted to his birth name for releases from 2012 onward.

2012-present
In 2012 he contributed a DJ mix to the Fabriclive series, and released the cassette-only mixtape Divided Love. The latter was limited to 100 copies, with one side dedicated to a club mix and the other to more ambient, chill out tracks. Avery's debut album, Drone Logic, was released in 2013. He issued a DJ-Kicks compilation in 2016. In 2018 he released the EP Slow Fade, followed by his second album, Song for Alpha, on early champion Erol Alkan's Phantasy Sound and Mute Records. The album was a marked change to his debut, with critics noting the influence of his collaborations with London producer Volte-Face (as the techno duo Rote) and Alessandro Cortini, with whom he put out a 7" ambient single in 2017. In 2020 he collaborated with Cortini on the album Illusion Of Time. The pair met when Avery supported Nine Inch Nails, for whom Cortini regularly plays, on a US tour in 2018.

In 2019, Avery sat in for Mary Anne Hobbs on her BBC Radio 6 Music programme, 6 Music Recommends. In 2020 he released the single "Lone Swordsman," in tribute to his mentor Andrew Weatherall, who died in February of that year. Proceeds from Bandcamp sales of the single went to Amnesty International. He surprise released his third album, Love + Light, in the summer of 2020. The album was a mix of uptempo dance and ambient tracks, returning to a dynamic first explored in his earlier Divided Love mix.

His fourth album, Together in Static, was released on  June 24, 2021. Avery released his fifth album, Ultra Truth, in November 2022. The record features vocals by Kelly Lee Owens, HTRK's Jonnie Standish, HAAi, Marie Davidson, and SHERELLE. It was preceded by the single "Chaos Energy."

Discography
Drone Logic (Phantasy Sound, 2013)
Fabriclive 66 (Phantasy Sound, 2013)
New Energy (Collected Remixes) (Because Music, 2015)
 DJ Kicks (K7, 2016)
Slow Fade (Phantasy/Mute, 2018)
Song for Alpha (Phantasy/Mute, 2018)
Song for Alpha (B-Sides & Remixes) (Phantasy Sound, 2019)
Illusion of Time (with Alessandro Cortini) (Rough Trade, 2020)
Love + Light (Phantasy Sound, 2020)
Together in Static (Phantasy Sound, 2021)
Ultra Truth (Phantasy Sound, 2022)

References

Year of birth missing (living people)
English electronic musicians
Musicians from Bournemouth
Living people